Exelis is a genus of moths in the family Geometridae erected by Achille Guenée in 1857.

Species
Exelis dicolus Rindge, 1952
Exelis mundaria Dyar, 1916
Exelis ophiurus Rindge, 1952
Exelis pyrolaria Guenee, 1857

References

Boarmiini